The 2020 Canadian Premier League Final determined the winner of the 2020 Canadian Premier League season. It was played on September 19, 2020, in Charlottetown, Prince Edward Island, between Forge FC, the defending league champion, and HFX Wanderers FC. Those teams qualified as the winner and runner-up of the group stage of The Island Games tournament.

The event was to be contested between the top-seeded team after the regular season and the winner of a one-game playoff, but the season format was revised after being impacted by the COVID-19 pandemic.

Forge FC won the match 2–0 to repeat as league champions, earning the club a berth in the 2021 CONCACAF League and the 2020 Canadian Championship Final. Forge ultimately reached the semifinals of the CONCACAF League to qualify for the 2022 CONCACAF Champions League and faced Toronto FC in the Canadian Championship Final where the club lost in a penalty shoot-out following a 1–1 draw.

Background

Forge FC entered the Final as the defending league champions, having defeated Cavalry FC in the 2019 Finals after finishing 2nd in the regular season. HFX Wanderers FC played in their first Final, improving from a last place finish in their inaugural season in 2019.

This was the seventh meeting all-time between the two clubs with each team having recorded one win and four draws against each other. Forge and HFX Wanderers faced off twice during the 2020 season with both matches ending in a 1–1 draw.

Path to the Final

First stage

Group stage

Match details

Summary

Details

References

External links

Final
Canadian Premier League Final